Unión Deportiva Melilla is a Spanish football team based in the autonomous city of Melilla. Founded in 1976, it currently plays in Segunda División RFEF – Group 5, holding home matches at Estadio Municipal Álvarez Claro, with a 8,000 capacity.

History
Founded in 1976 as Gimnástico Melilla Club de Fútbol after a merger of Melilla CF and Club Gimnástico de Cabrerizas, the club immediately took Cabrerizas' place in Tercera División. Renamed Unión Deportiva Melilla (as an honour to the club founded in the 1940s) in 1980, it reached Segunda División B in 1987, and has remained there until 2021 when the Spanish football structure changed.

Club background
Juventud Español — (1940–43)
Melilla Fútbol Club — (1921–43)
Unión Deportiva Melilla — (1943–56)
Club Deportivo Tesorillo — (1940–56)
Melilla Club de Fútbol – (1956–76)
Club Gimnástico de Cabrerizas – (1973–76)
Sociedad Deportiva Melilla – (1970–76)
Gimnástico Melilla Club de Fútbol – (1976–80)
Unión Deportiva Melilla – (1980–)

Other clubs from Melilla
Club Deportivo Real Melilla — (1939–)
Club de Fútbol Melilla Industrial – (1968–74)
Club de Fútbol Industrial Melilla – (1975–85)
Melilla Fútbol Club — (1985–91)

Rivalry
The Ceuta-Melilla derby was between Melilla and AD Ceuta, who were dissolved in 2012. The two clubs travelled to face each other via the Spanish mainland to avoid entering Morocco.

Season to season

34 seasons in Segunda División B
1 season in Segunda División RFEF
11 seasons in Tercera División

Current squad

Famous players

 Munir

Famous coaches
 Alvarito
 Juan Ramón López Caro

Reserve team

Their reserve team, UD Melilla B, played for several years in Primera Autonómica Melilla and in Tercera División before ceasing activities in 2012. In 2013, Casino del Real CF became their reserve side, and was subsequently renamed to Melilla B in 2014.

References

External links
Official website 
Futbolme team profile 

 
Football clubs in Melilla
Association football clubs established in 1976
1976 establishments in Spain
Segunda División clubs